A rondel is a verse form originating in French lyrical poetry of the 14th century. It was later used in the verse of other languages as well, such as English and Romanian. It is a variation of the rondeau consisting of two quatrains followed by a quintet (13 lines total) or a sestet (14 lines total). It is not to be confused with the roundel, a similar verse form with repeating refrain.

The first two lines of the first stanza are refrains, repeating as the last two lines of the second stanza and the third stanza.  (Alternately, only the first line is repeated at the end of the final stanza). For instance, if A and B are the refrains, a rondel will have a rhyme scheme of
ABba abAB abbaA(B)

The meter is open, but typically has eight syllables.

There are several variations of the rondel, and some inconsistencies. For example, sometimes only the first line of the poem is repeated at the end, or the second refrain may return at the end of the last stanza. Henry Austin Dobson provides the following example of a rondel:

    Love comes back to his vacant dwelling,
      The old, old Love that we knew of yore!
      We see him stand by the open door,
    With his great eyes sad, and his bosom swelling.

    He makes as though in our arms repelling
      He fain would lie as he lay before;
    Love comes back to his vacant dwelling,
      The old, old Love that we knew of yore!

    Ah ! who shall help us from over-spelling
      That sweet, forgotten, forbidden lore?
      E'en as we doubt, in our hearts once more,
    With a rush of tears to our eyelids welling,
    Love comes back to his vacant dwelling.

See also
Pierrot lunaire (book)
Rondeau (forme fixe)
Rondelet, a shorter variant

References

External links
 Rondel of Merciless Beauty, a rondel in variant form by Geoffrey Chaucer

Poetic forms
Western medieval lyric forms